Neeraj or Niraj (Devanagari: नीरज ) is a Hindu masculine given name. The Sanskrit word  is a compound of  'water' and  'born' and has the primary meaning of 'lotus'. The same Sanskrit word can also be a compound of  'without' (which takes the form  because of sandhi with the following word) and  'dust', 'emotion', with the overall meaning 'free from dust' or 'free from passion'

See also

References

Indian masculine given names
Sanskrit-language names